The International Computer and Information Literacy Study (ICILS) study assesses information and communications technology (I.C.T.) knowledge of students and teachers worldwide. This test was created by the International Association for the Evaluation of Educational Achievement (IEA) in June 2010. There have been two cycles of the study: ICILS 2013 and ICILS 2018. 

The first survey was conducted in 2013 and the results were released 3 March 2015. The test assessed computer and literacy skills of 60,000 8th grade students (average 13.5 years old) from 21 education systems worldwide. 18 of the 21 tested education systems had in place policies concerning the use of ICT in education. 

The second cycle of the study was conducted in 2018, the results of which were released on 5 November 2019. 

The third cycle of the study, ICILS 2023 was officially launched at the 2018 IEA General Assembly Meeting.

Assessment
The study was assessed through 4 levels:

 Knowledge of basic software
 Basic use of computers as information source
 Sufficient knowledge and skills of ICT for information gathering and use
 Critical thinking while searching for information online

ICILS 2013 results

ICILS 2013 found that only 2% of students use their critical thinking and teachers lack confidence in teaching essential ICT skills.’

83% of the student population achieved Level 1 status, while 2% of the population achieved Level 4 status. The study found that students use computers 87% of the time at home, more than they do in school, 54% of the time. ICILS has shown that in school, students use 45% of their time to prepare essays, 44% to prepare presentations, 40% working with other students at the same school, 39% completing school exercises and 30% organizing time and work. At home, students use 75% of their time communicating with others using messaging or social network, 52% searching for information for study or school work, 49% posting comments to online profiles or blogs and 48% using voice chat.

Fewer than half the teachers felt that they were capable of carrying out more complex tasks, such as installing software, collaborating with others and taking part in discussion forums.

The results of ICILS 2018 were released on 5 November 2019.

Participating education systems

ICILS 2013

ICILS 2018

References

Computer literacy